Haines is a city in Baker County, Oregon, United States. The population was 416 at the 2010 census.

History
Haines was platted in 1885 or 1886 along the Oregon Railway and Navigation Company rail line, having been a stage stop before then.

Geography

Climate
This region experiences warm (but not hot) and dry summers, with no average monthly temperatures above .  According to the Köppen Climate Classification system, Haines has a warm-summer Mediterranean climate, abbreviated "Csb" on climate maps.

Demographics

2010 census
As of the census of 2010, there were 416 people, 175 households, and 115 families living in the city. The racial makeup of the city was 94.5% White, 1.2% Native American, 0.7% from other races, and 3.6% from two or more races. Hispanic or Latino of any race were 1.4% of the population.

There were 175 households, of which 30.3% had children under the age of 18 living with them, 46.9% were married couples living together, 11.4% had a female householder with no husband present, 7.4% had a male householder with no wife present, and 34.3% were non-families. 27.4% of all households were made up of individuals, and 12% had someone living alone who was 65 years of age or older. The average household size was 2.38 and the average family size was 2.78.

The median age in the city was 43.3 years. 23.3% of residents were under the age of 18; 7.3% were between the ages of 18 and 24; 21.9% were from 25 to 44; 32.1% were from 45 to 64; and 15.4% were 65 years of age or older. The gender makeup of the city was 50.5% male and 49.5% female.

2000 census

As of the census of 2000, there were 426 people, 183 households, and 127 families living in the city. The population density was 535.9 people per square mile (208.2/km2). There were 207 housing units at an average density of 260.4 per square mile (101.2/km2). The racial makeup of the city was 95.77% White, 1.64% Native American, 0.47% Asian, and 2.11% from two or more races. Hispanic or Latino of any race were 1.64% of the population.

There were 183 households, out of which 32.8% had children under the age of 18 living with them, 50.3% were married couples living together, 12.0% had a female householder with no husband present, and 30.6% were non-families. 27.3% of all households were made up of individuals, and 13.1% had someone living alone who was 65 years of age or older. The average household size was 2.33 and the average family size was 2.82.

In the city, the population was spread out, with 27.2% under the age of 18, 5.6% from 18 to 24, 26.3% from 25 to 44, 24.2% from 45 to 64, and 16.7% who were 65 years of age or older. The median age was 39 years. For every 100 females, there were 96.3 males. For every 100 females age 18 and over, there were 93.8 males.

The median income for a household in the city was $25,000, and the median income for a family was $26,500. Males had a median income of $18,750 versus $14,875 for females. The per capita income for the city was $13,134. About 22.1% of families and 25.0% of the population were below the poverty line, including 41.7% of those under age 18 and 8.1% of those age 65 or over.

References

External links
 Entry for Haines in the Oregon Blue Book

Cities in Baker County, Oregon
Cities in Oregon
Populated places established in 1885
1885 establishments in Oregon